Werner Holzer (September 23, 1937 – October 29, 2018) was an American wrestler. He competed in the men's Greco-Roman 70 kg at the 1968 Summer Olympics.

References

1937 births
2018 deaths
American male sport wrestlers
Olympic wrestlers of the United States
Wrestlers at the 1968 Summer Olympics
Sportspeople from Chicago